The 1947 East Tennessee State Buccaneers football team was an American football team that represented East Tennessee State College (ETSC)—now known as East Tennessee State University—as an independent during the 1947 college football season. Led by first-year head coach Loyd Roberts the Buccaneers compiled a record of 5–4. The team was co-captained by Clyde Holsclaw and Joe Green. Roberts's only assistant coach was A. W."Bud" Carpenter, a former Buccaneer player and co-captain of the 1940 team. Funding and equipping the team was still a difficult issue with the total team budget including salaries at only $6,400.

Schedule

References

East Tennessee State
East Tennessee State Buccaneers football seasons
East Tennessee State Buccaneers football